MIP may refer to:

Science 
 Mixed integer programming, linear programming where some variables are constrained to be integers
 Minimum Ionizing Particle, in particle physics
 Maximum intensity projection, a computer visualization method
 Molecularly imprinted polymer, polymers processed using the molecular imprinting technique with affinity to a chosen 'template molecule'
 Moon Impact Probe, of the Indian lunar satellite Chandrayaan-1
 Model Intercomparison Project; see Coupled model intercomparison project
 MIP, an interactive proof system complexity class; see Interactive proof system
 Mars ISPP Precursor, a test payload intended to be flown on the cancelled Mars Surveyor 2001 Lander

Biology 
 Macrophage inflammatory protein, in biology
 Maximum Inspiratory Pressure, the maximum inspiratory pressure is the highest atmospheric pressure developed during inspiration against an occluded airway
 Methylation induced premeiotically
 Mid-inguinal point
 Molecular Inversion Probe
 Mitochondrial intermediate peptidase, an enzyme
 MIP (gene), a gene in humans

Arts and entertainment 
 Mipcom, a TV and entertainment market
 museum in progress, a non-commercial art association, based in Vienna
 Most Improved Player (disambiguation)

Business 
 Mortgage insurance premium
 Managers in Partnership (MIP), a British trade union for healthcare managers
 Managing Intellectual Property, a monthly magazine specialized in intellectual property law and business
 Master in Ingegneria della Produzione (MIP), Politecnico di Milano School of Management
 Mint in Package; a collectors' abbreviation; see Mint condition

Government and politics 
 Macroeconomic Imbalance Procedure, a European Union economic governance procedure
 Minor In Possession in U.S. civil law
 Multilateral Interoperability Programme, a consortium of 29 NATO and Non-NATO nations
 Popular Independent Movement, a Luxembourgian political party in the 1960s

Technology 
 Male Iron Pipe, a plumbing pipe connection to an FIP (Female Iron Pipe); see National Pipe Thread
 Mega-frame Initialization Packet, an MPEG-2 Transport Stream packet used for synchronization in DVB-T single-frequency networks
 Memory in Pixel, a type of liquid crystal display
 Mipmap (multum in parvo, much in little space), a sequences of images, each of which is a progressively lower resolution than the previous
 Mobile IP, an IP protocol extension to provide mobility in the Internet

See also
 MIPS (disambiguation)